

Belgium
 Belgian Congo – Maurice Lippens, Governor-General of the Belgian Congo (1921–1923)

France
 French Somaliland – Jules Gérard Auguste Lauret, Governor of French Somaliland (1918–1924)
 Guinea – 
 Jean Louis Georges Poiret, Lieutenant-Governor of Guinea (1920–1922)
 Jules Vidal, acting Lieutenant-Governor of Guinea (1922)
 Jean Louis Georges Poiret, Lieutenant-Governor of Guinea (1922–1925)

Japan
 Karafuto – Nagai Kinjirō, Governor-General of Karafuto(17 April 1919 – 11 June 1924)
 Korea – Saitō Makoto, Governor-General of Korea (1919–1927)
 Taiwan – Den Kenjirō, Governor-General of Taiwan (31 October 1919 – September 1923)

Portugal
 Angola – João Mendes Ribeiro Norton de Matos, High Commissioner of Angola (1921–1924)
 Portuguese Timor – José de Paiva Gomes, Governor (1921–1923)

United Kingdom
 Malta Colony – Herbert Plumer, Governor of Malta (1919–1924)
 Northern Rhodesia – Sir Francis Chaplin, Administrator of Northern Rhodesia (1921–1923)

Colonial governors
Colonial governors
1922